Anapisa cleta is a moth of the  family Erebidae. It was described by Plötz in 1880. It is found in Cameroon.

References

Endemic fauna of Cameroon
Moths described in 1880
Syntomini
Insects of Cameroon
Moths of Africa